Daniel Benyamini (Tel Aviv, 1925–1993) was an Israeli violist, who studied at the Shulamit Conservatory.

He served as the Israel Philharmonic's principal violist (1960–1990), a chair he also held at the Orchestre de Paris under Daniel Barenboim. In addition, he was internationally active as a soloist and a chamber musician, and was a professor at the newly founded Escuela Superior de Música Reina Sofía for the two last years of his life.

References
 Obituary at El País, March 7, 1993.
   Biblioteca Virtual Miguel de Cervantes

Israeli classical violists
1925 births
1993 deaths
20th-century classical musicians
20th-century violists